Marogaona is a town and commune in northern Madagascar. It belongs to the district of Sambava, which is a part of Sava Region. The population of the commune was estimated to be approximately 7,000 in 2001 commune census.

Only primary schooling is available in town. The majority 99% of the population the commune are farmers.  The most important crops are coffee and vanilla; also rice is an important agricultural product. Services provide employment for 1% of the population.

References and notes 

Populated places in Sava Region